Septuaginta is a genus of moths in the family Pterophoridae containing only one species, Septuaginta zagulajevi, which is found in Russia (the Chita region in Siberia).

See also
 Septuagint (disambiguation)

References

Moths described in 1996
Pterophoridae
Moths of Asia